Huangshi is a city in Hubei, China.

Huangshi may refer to the Mandarin Chinese pinyin transliteration one of two similarly pronounced names for Chinese locations ('黄石' Huángshí (yellow stone) and '黄市' Huángshì):

Other places in China
Wong Shek, a hill on the Sai Kung Peninsula, Tai Po District, Hong Kong

Subdistrict
Huangshi Subdistrict (黄石街道), Baiyun District, Guangzhou, Guangdong

Towns
There are numerous towns referred to as Huangshi, often with the identical Chinese name "黄石镇":
Huangshi, in Yunyang County, Chongqing
Huangshi, Licheng District, Putian, Fujian
Huangshi, Longchuan County, Heyan, Guangdong
Huangshi, Ningdu County, Ganzhou, Jiangxi
Huangshi, Leiyang, Hengyang, Hunan
Huangshi, Taoyuan County, Changde, Hunan
Huangshi (黄市), Yantan District, Zigong, Sichuan

Townships
Huangshi Township (黄市乡), Miluo City, Yueyang, Hunan
Huangshi Township (黄石乡), Xuanhan County, Dazhou, Sichuan

Historical eras
Huangshi (皇始, 351–355), era name used by Fu Jian (317–355), emperor of Former Qin
Huangshi (皇始, 396–398), era name used by Emperor Daowu of Northern Wei

See also
Yellowstone (disambiguation)